Torkadeh is a village in Sanjabad-e Shomali Rural District, in the Central District of Kowsar County, Ardabil Province, Iran. At the 2006 census, its population was 56, in 13 families.

photos 

ممنمم

References 

Tageo

Towns and villages in Kowsar County